The Croatia national speedway team are motorcycle speedway national team from Croatia.

European Championships

Pairs

Honours

European Championships 

National speedway teams
Speedway
Speedway